In the United States, there are currently seven routes in the Interstate Highway System that are signed with letter suffixes to the route number. Interstate 35 (I-35) splits into I-35E and I-35W in the Dallas–Fort Worth metroplex in Texas, and similarly splits into I-35E and I-35W in the Minneapolis–St. Paul area in Minnesota. Other suffixed Interstates include I-69C, I-69E and I-69W in South Texas, and I-480N in Ohio, which is designated as such on mile markers but is otherwise unsigned. The state of Maryland has several unsigned suffixed Interstate designations that are designated by the Maryland State Highway Administration, rather than by the Federal Highway Administration (FHWA).

There were once many more suffixed Interstates, as the three-digit Interstates were not designated until after all major routes were assigned numbers. Most of these were spurs; the suffixed route did not return to its parent. In 1980, the American Association of State Highway and Transportation Officials (AASHTO) abolished the majority of suffixes due to confusion, renumbering them as three-digit Interstates. For example, I-15E in California has since become I-215.

List

See also

 List of divided U.S. Routes

References

External links

Suffixed
Interstate Suffixed